BioMed Research International is a peer-reviewed open access scientific journal covering all aspects of biomedical sciences. It was established in 2001 as the Journal of Biomedicine and Biotechnology with Abdelali Haoudi as first editor-in-chief (until 2008). The journal obtained its current title in 2013 and is published by Hindawi Publishing Corporation.

Abstracting and indexing 
The journal is abstracted and indexed in:

According to the Journal Citation Reports, the journal has a 2014 impact factor of 1.579, and in 2016 its ranking was 65/158 of Biotechnology & Applied Microbiology.

References

External links 

 

Hindawi Publishing Corporation academic journals
Publications established in 2001
Open access journals
English-language journals
Biology journals
General medical journals